A convention center (American English; or conference centre in British English) is a large building that is designed to hold a convention, where individuals and groups gather to promote and share common interests. Convention centers typically offer sufficient floor area to accommodate several thousand attendees. Very large venues, suitable for major trade shows, are sometimes known as exhibition halls. Convention centers typically have at least one auditorium and may also contain concert halls, lecture halls, meeting rooms, and conference rooms. Some large resort area hotels include a convention center.

Types

 Meeting facilities with lodging: hotels that include their own convention space in addition to accommodation and other related facilities, known as convention hotels.
 Meeting facilities without lodging: are convention centers that do not include accommodation; usually located adjacent to or near a hotel(s).
 Other: any convention and meeting facilities designed to hold large numbers of people. Can exist alone (e.g., stadiums, arenas, parks, etc.) or within other structures (e.g., university lecture halls, museums, theaters). Usually do not include accommodation.

History 
The original convention centers or halls were in castles and palaces. Originally a hall in a castle would be designed to allow a large group of lords, knights and government officials to attend important meetings with the king. A more ancient tradition would have the king or lord decide disputes among his people. These administrative actions would be done in the great hall and would exhibit the wisdom of the king as judge to the general populace.

One of the most famous convention center debacles happened in France on June 20, 1789. King Louis XVI locked a group known as the Third Estate out of the meeting hall in Versailles. This led to the revolutionary group holding their meeting in an indoor tennis court. This was the first modern democratic conference center and lead to the Tennis Court Oath and the French Revolution.

Some historic centers

19th-century exhibition halls

 1850 Bingley Hall (destroyed by fire in 1984), Birmingham, England
 1851 The Crystal Palace (destroyed by fire in 1936), London, England
 1855 Palais de l'Industrie (dismantled in 1897), Paris, France
 1873 Alexandra Palace, London, England
 1876 Memorial Hall, Philadelphia, Pennsylvania, United States
 1878 Exhibition Place, Toronto, Canada
 1878 La Rural, Buenos Aires, Argentina
1878 Music Hall, Cincinnati, Ohio, United States
 1879 Garden Palace (destroyed by fire in 1882), Sydney, Australia
 1880 Royal Exhibition Building, Melbourne, Australia
 1898 Aberdeen Pavilion, Ottawa, Canada
 1898–1903 Beurs van Berlage, Amsterdam, Netherlands

20th-century exhibition halls
 1900 Grand Palais, Paris, France
 1909 Festhalle, Frankfurt, Germany 
 1955 McCormick Place, Chicago, Illinois, USA 
 1958 Centre of New Industries and Technologies, Paris, France
 1959 Las Vegas Convention Center, Las Vegas, Nevada, USA 
 1974 Kenyatta International Convention Centre, Nairobi, Kenya
 1975 Helsinki Fair Centre, Helsinki, Finland
 1976 Georgia World Congress Center, Atlanta, Georgia, USA
 1979 Internationales Congress Centrum, Berlin, Germany
 1981 Moscone Center, San Francisco, California, USA
 1983 Hong Kong Convention and Exhibition Centre, Hong Kong, China
 1985 Tampere Fair Centre, Tampere, Finland
 1988 Washington State Convention Center, Seattle, Washington, USA
 1989 Taipei International Convention Center, Taipei, Taiwan
 1990 Colorado Convention Center, Denver, Colorado, USA
 1993 Pennsylvania Convention Center, Philadelphia, Pennsylvania, USA
 1997 Tokyo International Forum, Tokyo, Japan

21st-century exhibition halls
 2001 Bethlehem Convention Palace, Bethlehem
 2003 Walter E. Washington Convention Center, Washington, D.C., USA
 2008 BT Convention Centre, Liverpool, UK
 2008 Raleigh Convention Center, Raleigh, North Carolina, USA
 2012 Convention Center Poet Ronaldo Cunha Lima, João Pessoa, Brazil
 2014 Kaohsiung Exhibition Center, Kaohsiung City, Taiwan
 2017 AU Convention Center, Visakhapatnam, India
 2021 Rudraksha Convention Center, Varanasi, India

Image gallery

See also
 Stadium
 List of convention and exhibition centers
 List of convention centers named after people

References

External links 

 Historic Conference Centres of Europe